Marc-David Munk (born 1973) is an American and Canadian physician and healthcare executive who, according to the Advisory Board, a US healthcare consultancy, has "a reputation as an innovator." Munk is recognized as a thought leader in the area of value-based, consumer-facing healthcare and global health.

Since 2018, Munk has served as  President of the Middle East and Asia Regions for Steward Health Care, a rapidly growing $8B American Healthcare delivery company founded in 2010. Steward is the largest privately held American healthcare system and was, in 2021, the largest Medicare Accountable Care Organization in the United States. Based in Madrid since 2017, Steward International operates healthcare facilities in Europe, South America and the Middle East.

Experience as an Expert in Alternative Care Delivery Models 
Munk previously served as the Chief Medical Officer for Clinics and Retail Pharmacy at CVS Health. His hire was, according to journalists at Bloomberg, “a sign that the drugstore chain is serious about providing more medical services directly to consumers"    The Advisory Board noted: "Munk's impressive background will not only lead to care delivery enhancements, but also to further innovation as [CVS] look[s] for ways to expand and integrate health care services".   
 
Prior to joining CVS, Munk was the Chief Medical Officer at Iora Health, a Boston-based primary care company that has been highlighted by the New York Times and Wall Street Journal for its innovative and effective care model. Business Insider in 2018 noted, "Munk led the health care system's care model and care delivery at practices across seven states. During his tenure, Munk helped restructure Iora Health's model of care, including integrated behavioral health. His work resulted in improved care quality scores across Iora Health's health care system.  In 2021 Iora was acquired by publically traded One Medical for an estimated US$2.1B.  It was announced in July 2022 that the combined company would be acquired by Amazon for approximately US$3.8B 

In 2012, a cover story in Health Leaders Magazine identified Munk as an expert in innovation to support capitated/ value based payment models. The article notes: "[Innovation] comes at a lower cost for us," Munk says. "And it's something that we would find difficult to bill for in a FFS environment...these kinds of things improve the care that we can deliver to patients... Everybody benefits when we get a little more intelligent about how to spend those dollars."

Education 
Munk received his B.A. in liberal arts from Colgate University, a Master of Public Health degree in epidemiology from Boston University, and a MD degree from Philadelphia’s Jefferson Medical College. He completed a residency in emergency medicine and fellowship in global health at University of Pittsburgh Medical Center and later earned a Diploma in Tropical Medicine and Hygiene. In 2012 he earned a Master of Science degree in healthcare management from Harvard T.H. Chan School of Public Health.

Other Work 
Munk is President of Toronto based Carlin Foundation, which funds early stage innovation in healthcare.   He is also the Board Chairman for the non-profit Maine Center for Prehosptial Education and he volunteers as a strategic advisor to multiple Boston/ Cambridge MA based healthcare startups. From 2017- 2020 he was an Entrepreneur in Residence at the Harvard Innovation Labs, in Boston.

Munk was among the first doctors to describe Pine Mouth Syndrome, an unusual pine-nut related toxidrome. This work was referenced by NPR among other news sources.

References 

21st-century Canadian physicians
Living people
1973 births
21st-century American physicians
Colgate University alumni
Boston University School of Public Health alumni
Jefferson Medical College alumni
Harvard School of Public Health alumni
Canadian people of Swiss descent
American people of Swiss descent
Canadian people of Hungarian-Jewish descent